Carolyn Comitta is an American politician, educator and financial officer. A Democrat, she is a member of the Pennsylvania State Senate representing the 19th district. Previously, Comitta was the first woman to serve as Mayor of West Chester, the seat of Chester County, Pennsylvania, and served two terms in the Pennsylvania House of Representatives representing the 156th district.

Early life and education
Comitta was born in Buffalo, New York, and her family moved to West Goshen when she was 2 years old, where she has lived ever since. Comitta received her BS in Education from West Chester University (then West Chester State College) in 1974, and her M.Ed. from Widener University in 1989.

Professional career
From the mid-1970s to the mid-1980s, Comitta worked in the Octorara Area School District as a special and gifted education curriculum specialist and teacher. Since 1988, she has been a member of the Board of Directors of World Information Transfer, Inc., a non-profit, non-governmental educational organization focused on health- and environment-related issues.

She is the Vice President and Chief Financial Officer of her husband's firm, Thomas Comitta Associates, Town Planners and Landscape Architects.

Political career

West Chester Borough Council

Comitta was first elected to the West Chester Borough Council in 2005, taking-over the Fifth Ward seat vacated by incumbent Democratic Councilwoman Barbara McIlvaine Smith. While on Council, she served as chair of the Borough Council's Public Safety Committee, and also chaired the Planning Zoning, Business & Industrial Development Committee. She also served as a member of the Parks, Recreation and Environmental Protection Committee, as well as the Finance Committee.

Mayor of West Chester 
She sought the office of Borough Mayor in 2009, and defeated Councilman Bill Scott in the Democratic primary. She was elected unopposed in the fall general election, and took office the following January. In succeeding the term-limited incumbent Mayor, Republican Dick Yoder, Comitta became West Chester's first ever female Mayor, and its first Democratic Mayor since 1992.

Pennsylvania House of Representatives
On January 7, 2016, Comitta announced her intent to run for the Pennsylvania House of Representatives in the 156th District, challenging incumbent Dan Truitt. After a lengthy recount, she was declared the winner over Truitt by 25 votes on December 16, 2016.

On November 6, 2018, Comitta won re-election against Republican challenger Nicholas Deminski by a margin of 13 points or 4,108 votes.

In 2020, Comitta sought re-election to her House seat and was unopposed in the Democratic primary. She ended her House campaign in June 2020 to focus on her Senate campaign and was replaced on the ballot by West Chester mayor Dianne Herrin.

Pennsylvania State Senate
In February 2020, State Senator Andy Dinniman announced his retirement at the end of his term. Dinniman's retirement as considered surprising as he had been preparing for a re-election campaign for a fourth term and petitioning had already begun. The day after Dinniman's announcement, Comitta announced her campaign for the Pennsylvania State Senate in the 19th District. In a three-way Democratic primary against Dinniman's longtime aide Don Vymazal and local school board member Kyle Boyer, Dinniman endorsed Vymazal, while Comitta was endorsed by Governor Tom Wolf and several labor unions. After Pennsylvania delayed their primary to June 2 due to the COVID-19 pandemic, Comitta won the primary with nearly 51% of the vote.

In the general election, Comitta defeated Republican Kevin Runey with 57.43% of the vote.

Electoral history

Pennsylvania's 156th Legislative District

2016 election

2018 election

2020 Democratic Primary

Pennsylvania's 19th Senatorial District

2020 Democratic Primary

2020 general election

Personal life
Comitta and her husband, Tom, have two grown children.  Tom Comitta is a Planner and Landscape Architect.

References

External links
Carolyn Comitta Campaign website
Official Senate webpage

|-

Living people
Widener University alumni
West Chester University alumni
1952 births
Democratic Party members of the Pennsylvania House of Representatives
Democratic Party Pennsylvania state senators
Women mayors of places in Pennsylvania
Women state legislators in Pennsylvania
21st-century American women politicians
Mayors of West Chester, Pennsylvania
Politicians from West Chester, Pennsylvania
Schoolteachers from Pennsylvania